is a Japanese term for unbalancing an opponent in the Japanese martial arts.

The noun comes from the transitive verb kuzusu (崩す), meaning to level, pull down, destroy or demolish.  As such, it refers to not just an unbalancing, but the process of putting an opponent to a position, where stability, and hence the ability to regain uncompromised balance for attacking, is destroyed.

In judo, it is considered an essential principle and the first of three stages to a successful throwing technique: kuzushi, tsukuri (fitting or entering) and kake (execution).

Kuzushi is important to many styles of Japanese martial arts, especially those derived from, or influenced by, Ju Jutsu training methods, such as Judo, Ninjutsu, Aikido, Uechi-ryu karate, Goju-ryu karate, and Wadō-ryū karate.

The methods of effecting kuzushi depend on maai (combative distance) and other circumstances.  It can be achieved using tai sabaki (body positioning and weak lines), taking advantage of the opponents actions (push when pulled, pull when pushed), atemi (strikes), or a combination of all three.

Judo
There are three primary ways of applying kuzushi in judo:
direct action (e.g. pulling or pushing while entering for a throw);
inducing opponent's action (e.g. a feint or combination attack);
direct action by opponent (e.g. a counter throw).

References

Further  reading 
 Kano Jigoro, (1994) Kodokan Judo  .
 Ohlenkamp, Neil (2006) Judo Unleashed .

External links
 kuzushi judoinfo.com
 kuzushi: beginning and advanced concepts bestjudo.com/blog
 Kumite Gata and the Essence of Wado-ryu. Part III: The Principle of Kuzushi zenshindojo.fi

Japanese martial arts terminology